A doorstop (also door stopper, door stop or door wedge) is an object or device used to hold a door open or closed, or to prevent a door from opening too widely. The same word is used to refer to a thin slat built inside a door frame to prevent a door from swinging through when closed. A doorstop (applied) may also be a small bracket or 90-degree piece of metal applied to the frame of a door to stop the door from swinging (bi-directional) and converting that door to a single direction (in-swing push or out-swing pull). The doorstop can be a separate part or integrated with a hinge or door closer. Also called a tanogen.

History 
Formally-produced doorstops trace their history to the 18th century in Europe, becoming widely manufactured in Europe in the early 19th century. By the mid 19th century, manufacturing had primarily moved to the United States. Despite their early manufacturing, credit for the invention of the doorstop is usually granted to Osburn Dorsey, an African American inventor, in 1878. The doorstop was Dorsey's most famous invention and he received a US patent, number 210,764, for the invention.

Usage

Holding doors open 
A door may be stopped by a doorstop which is simply a heavy solid object, such as a rubber, placed in the path of the door. These stops are predominantly improvised. Historically, lead bricks have been popular choices when available. However, as the toxic nature of lead has been revealed, this use has been strongly discouraged.

Another method is to use a doorstop which is a small wedge of wood, rubber, fabric, plastic, cotton or another material. Manufactured wedges of these materials are commonly available. The wedge is kicked into position and the downward force of the door, now jammed upwards onto the doorstop, provides enough static friction to keep it motionless.

A third strategy is to equip the door itself with a stopping mechanism. In this case, a short metal bar capped with rubber, or another high-friction material, is attached to a hinge near the bottom of the door opposite the door hinge and on the side of the door which is in the direction that it closes.  When the door is to be kept open, the bar is swung down so that the rubber end touches the floor. In this configuration, further movement of the door towards being closed increases the force on the rubber end, thereby increasing the frictional force which opposes the movement.  When the door is to be closed, the stop is released by pushing the door slightly more open, which releases the stop and allows it to be flipped upwards. A newer version of equipping the door with the stopping mechanism is to attach a magnet to the bottom or top of the door on the side which opens outward, which then latches onto another magnet or magnetic material on the wall or a small hub on the floor. The magnet must be strong enough to hold the weight of the door, but weak enough to be easily detached from the wall or hub.

Preventing damage by doors
Another type of doorstop is used to prevent doors from opening too far and damaging nearby walls. In this case a rubber cylinder or dome—or a rod or block of rubber-tipped metal, wood or plastic—is screwed into the wall, molding or the floor in the path of the door. If it is attached to the wall, it may be either a few inches above the ground, or at such a height as to meet the doorknob. A short, wall-attached doorstop, usually a rubber dome or cylinder, is sometimes called a wall bumper.

On occasion, stops are used that are fitted at the midpoint of the door, as part of the central door-hinge. Such stops are known as a "hinge stops" or "hinge pin" doorstops and are often used to prevent damage to baseboard molding.

Holding doors closed
In his 1906 book The Right Way to Do Wrong, Harry Houdini recommends the use of a doorstop wedge to prevent a door from being pushed open from the outside, to deter burglars at night.

Dialect usage
In various British English dialects, including those in the south-west, north-east and north-west of England, the word "doorstop" is cognate with "doorstep" in standard English, being derived from door and stoop.

References

External links
 

Door furniture